US Rail is a Senegalese football club based in Thiès, which is part of the Senegal National League.

History
They played sometimes in the top division in Senegalese football. Their home stadium is Stade Maniang Soumaré.

Basketball
The affiliated basketball team plays in the Senegal D-1.

Notes

Football clubs in Senegal
Basketball teams in Senegal
Football clubs in Serer country
Basketball clubs in Serer country
Sport in Thiès